Higher Level is the debut album by reggaeton singer Fito Blanko, released in 2004. The album is entirely produced by Peruvian-Canadian producer Sensei, and it features the singles "Me Voy a Marchar", "By My Side" and "Take Her Home". The latter two were released in conjunction with Ivy Queen's two singles "Quiero Saber" and "Papi Te Quiero" as a double release on Universal Music Latino.

Track listing
"Sobeteo" - 3:17 
"Ya Llego" - 3:59 
"Vultron/...45" - 7:25 
"Dame Mas Plena" - 2:02 
"Gruvea" - 3:55 
"Fronteo" - 3:33 
"Take Her Home" - 3:50 
"By My Side" - 3:44 
"Todo de Mi" - 3:10 
"Puñal de Amor" - 3:33 
"Me Voy a Marchar" - 4:37 
"Quiero Amanecer" - 3:31 
"En Callao" - 3:32 
"Ten Fe" - 3:33 
"Dime Porque" - 3:46

References

2004 debut albums
Reggaeton albums